Coloptilia is a genus of moths in the family Gelechiidae described by Thomas Bainbrigge Fletcher in 1940.

Species
Coloptilia conchylidella (Hofman, 1898)

References

Apatetrini